The 1938 Holy Cross Crusaders football team represented the College of the Holy Cross during the 1938 college football season. The Crusaders were led by sixth-year head coach Eddie Anderson and played their home games at Fitton Field in Worcester, Massachusetts. Holy Cross's sole loss on the year came on a road trip to Carnegie Tech, where a missed extra point by the Crusaders prevented the tie. They finished ninth in the final AP Poll, the best finish in the Crusaders' history.

Schedule

References

Holy Cross
Holy Cross Crusaders football seasons
Holy Cross Crusaders football